Harmagedon or Harmageddon may refer to:

 Har-Magedon, a variant spelling of Armageddon
 "Harmageddon" (song), a 1998 song and single by Apocalyptica
 Harmagedon, an animated feature film version of the manga series Genma Wars

See also
 Armageddon (disambiguation)